Pakistan Chronicle is a chronicle on Pakistan history edited by Aqeel Jafri.

It covers events from 1947 to 2018 and contains more than 5,000 events and 4,000 pictures related to politics, literature, media, fine arts, sports, and entertainment.

References

2010 non-fiction books
History of Pakistan
Asian chronicles